Chinamans Hat Island is an islet located  off the south coast of Yorke Peninsula in Investigator Strait in South Australia about  south-west of Stenhouse Bay and within  of the shore.  As of 2014, it is located within the Innes National Park.

Description
The islet is named due to the similarity of its shape to a conical Asian hat. Access is reported as being ‘best gained by small boat, taking care to avoid the shallow rocks and reefs in the surrounding waters.’  
The name ‘Chinamans Hat’ is also informally used for other features near the islet such as the small bay located between it and the mainland, the intertidal reef that connects it to the mainland and facilities on the mainland provided as part of the Innes National Park.

Formation, geology and oceanography
Chinamans Hat Island was formed between 7500 and 8900 years ago after sea levels rose at the start of the Holocene thereby separating Yorke Peninsula from Kangaroo Island.
Chinamans Hat Island is reported as being entirely composed of a Bridgewater Formation calcarenite rock with ‘distinct horizontal layers of hard calcrete’.

Flora and fauna

Flora
A survey conducted in 1996 found eleven species of plants including sea celery, marsh saltbush, round leaved pigface, ruby saltbush, grey samphire, nitre-bush, bower spinach and common iceplant.

Fauna
As of 1996, vertebrate animals were represented by bird species such as little penguins, feral pigeons and sooty oystercatchers.

Protected areas status
Chinamans Hat Island has been reported as being part of the Innes National Park by 1980.  Since 2012, the waters surrounding its shores are located in a sanctuary zone within the boundaries of the South Spencer Gulf Marine Park.

References

Islands of South Australia
Uninhabited islands of Australia
Yorke Peninsula
Investigator Strait
Penguin colonies